Jubilee Wood comprises  of mixed woodland with rocky outcrops. It was presented to Leicestershire County Council in 1977 to commemorate the Silver Jubilee of Elizabeth II.

The site is adjoining The Outwoods, managed by Charnwood Borough Council.

References 

Parks and open spaces in Leicestershire